Baker is a census-designated place located in San Bernardino County, California, US.  As of the 2010 census, the CDP had a total population of 735.  Baker's ZIP Code is 92309 and the community is within area codes 442 and 760.

History
Baker was founded as a station on the Tonopah and Tidewater Railroad in 1908 and was named for Richard C. Baker, business partner of Francis Marion Smith in building the railroad.  Baker later became president of the T&T himself.

Baker was established in 1929 by Ralph Jacobus Fairbanks (1857–1942), who was an American prospector, entrepreneur, and pioneer who established several towns in the Death Valley area of California, including Fairbanks Springs (1904–05) and Shoshone (1910).

It is the site of a vacant, 223-bed for-profit prison formerly operated by Cornell Corrections which experienced a major riot on December 2, 2003, four weeks before it was temporarily closed. It was permanently closed on December 25, 2009. GEO Group purchased Cornell Companies, its owner, on August 12, 2010. It had previously experienced escapes in August and November 1995 and two on July 15, 1997.

Geography and climate
Baker is located at  (35.265099, -116.074768). Baker is located in the Mojave Desert at the junction of Interstate 15 and SR 127 (Death Valley Road). The Cronese Mountains are located southwest of the community. According to the United States Census Bureau, the CDP covers an area of 2.7 square miles (7.0 km), all of it land.

Demographics

The 2010 United States Census reported that Baker had a population of 735. The racial makeup of Baker was 302 (41.1%) White (26.5% Non-Hispanic White), 1 (0.1%) African American, 5 (0.7%) Native American, 10 (1.4%) Asian, 14 (1.9%) Pacific Islander, 380 (51.7%) from other races, and 23 (3.1%) from two or more races. Hispanic or Latino of any race were 502 persons (68.3%).

The Census reported that 731 people (99.5% of the population) lived in households, 4 (0.5%) lived in non-institutionalized group quarters, and 0 (0%) were institutionalized.

There were 215 households, out of which 122 (56.7%) had children under the age of 18 living in them, 106 (49.3%) were opposite-sex married couples living together, 39 (18.1%) had a female householder with no husband present, 23 (10.7%) had a male householder with no wife present.  There were 29 (13.5%) unmarried opposite-sex partnerships, and 1 (0.5%) same-sex married couples or partnerships. 28 households (13.0%) were made up of individuals, and 4 (1.9%) had someone living alone who was 65 years of age or older. The average household size was 3.40.  There were 168 families (78.1% of all households); the average family size was 3.74.

The population was spread out, with 277 people (37.7%) under the age of 18, 80 people (10.9%) aged 18 to 24, 236 people (32.1%) aged 25 to 44, 121 people (16.5%) aged 45 to 64, and 21 people (2.9%) who were 65 years of age or older.  The median age was 26.1 years. For every 100 females, there were 113.7 males.  For every 100 females age 18 and over, there were 111.1 males.

The homeowner vacancy rate was 1.7%; the rental vacancy rate was 20.8%.  414 people (56.3% of the population) lived in owner-occupied housing units and 317 people (43.1%) lived in rental housing units.

According to the 2010 United States Census, Baker had a median household income of $33,068, with 9.9% of the population living below the federal poverty line.

Economy

Baker's economy is based primarily on tourism. The town is frequently used as a stop for food and fuel by drivers on Interstate 15 between Los Angeles and Las Vegas. It is the last town for those traveling on SR 127 north to Death Valley National Park or south to the Mojave National Preserve. Currently there is only one motel in Baker, the Santa Fe Motel, formerly the Wills Fargo Motel.

Baker Airport is a small facility owned by the U.S. Department of the Interior, Bureau of Land Management, but it is managed by San Bernardino County Department of airports

Government

State and federal representation

Since Baker is an unincorporated community of San Bernardino County, County CEO, Leonard X. Hernandez, would be considered the Chief Administrator of Baker.

Water, Sanitary Sewers, Trash Collection Services, Fire Protection, Television Translators, Road Maintenance, Street Lighting, Park and Recreation is administered by the Baker Community Services District

Mars rover test site

The Mars Science Laboratory Team tested an engineering model of the Curiosity rover in the desert near Baker.

Attractions

 The town's most prominent feature is a  thermometer, dubbed "the world's tallest thermometer". Visible for miles, it was not operational from 2012 to mid-2014 when it was relighted following restoration.  Its height commemorates the hottest temperature ever recorded on Earth, in nearby Death Valley on July 10, 1913.  The thermometer was featured on the television show Strange Inheritance season 1 episode 13 on the Fox Business Network. 
 Dumont Dunes Off-Highway Vehicle Area, a popular area for ATV riders.
 Just a few miles to the west along I-15 lies the exit for Zzyzx Road. This dirt road leads to Soda Springs, the site of the health resort established by Curtis Springer in the late 1940s and now the Desert Study Center maintained by the California State University.
 A yearly race is held called "The Challenge Cup Relay: Baker to Vegas" or commonly referred as "Baker to Vegas" where law enforcement do a relay running race from Baker, CA to Las Vegas, NV.  It attracts law enforcement agencies including LAPD, national, and international agencies to participate annually.

In popular culture
The Big Empty
Fear and Loathing in Las Vegas
In the video game Fallout: New Vegas, the fictional town of Novac is located in the Mojave desert near the real-world location of Baker, and features as a main attraction the world's second-largest thermometer.

See also

 List of census-designated places in California

References

External links

 Baker Chamber of Commerce
 A history of Baker
 Pilgrims in the Desert - a book on the history of Baker
 History and photos of Baker's roadside attractions
 Mojave National Preserve

Populated places in the Mojave Desert
Census-designated places in San Bernardino County, California
Census-designated places in California